It's About Time is an album by saxophonist Jimmy Hamilton which was recorded in 1961 and released on the Swingville label.

Reception

Scott Yanow of Allmusic states: "Hamilton is matched in a sextet with flugelhornist Clark Terry, trombonist Britt Woodman, pianist Tommy Flanagan, bassist Wendell Marshall and drummer Mel Lewis for a set of mostly blues. Terry and Woodman are quite exuberant throughout". All About Jazz called it "a very strong album, and it has a home-run swing".

Track listing 
All compositions by Jimmy Hamilton
 "Two for One" – 5:48
 "Mr. Good Blues" – 6:40
 "Peanut Head" – 5:12
 "Stupid But Not Crazy" – 5:17
 "Nits and Wits" – 9:44
 "Gone With the Blues" – 4:54

Personnel 
Jimmy Hamilton – clarinet, tenor saxophone
Clark Terry – trumpet, flugelhorn
Britt Woodman – trombone
Tommy Flanagan – piano
Wendell Marshall – bass
Mel Lewis – drums

References 

Jimmy Hamilton albums
1961 albums
Swingville Records albums
Albums recorded at Van Gelder Studio
Albums produced by Esmond Edwards